The Albany Timber Carnival was held in Albany, Oregon from 1941 to 2000. The event returned in 2008 and featured competitive logrolling, wood chopping, cross-cut sawing, and Hot Saw. Chainsaw carving artwork was also displayed.

See also

List of chainsaw carving competitions

References

1941 establishments in Oregon
2000 disestablishments in Oregon
Culture of Albany, Oregon
Recurring events established in 1941
Timber industry